Musafir  is a 1940 social Hindi language film directed by Chaturbhuj Doshi.
Produced by Ranjit Studios, the music was by Gyan Dutt and it starred Noor Mohammed Charlie, Khursheed, Ishwarlal and Yakub.

The story was about a prince (Charlie) who returns to his kingdom and finds it in a mess due to the evil-doers' conspiracies to take over. The film was given a good review by the editor of Filmindia, Baburao Patel, adding, "For sheer entertainment Musafir is hard to beat".

Cast
 Noor Mohammed Charlie
 Khursheed
 Ishwarlal
 Yakub
 Vasanti
 Bhupatrai
 Kesari
 Mirza Mushraff
 Bhagwandas

Music
The music direction was by Gyan Dutt with lyrics written by D. N. Madhok. The singers were Brijmala, Khursheed, Charlie, Vasanti and Kantilal.

Song List

References

External links
 

1940 films
1940s Hindi-language films
Films scored by Gyan Dutt
Indian black-and-white films
Films directed by Chaturbhuj Doshi